was a Japanese novelist and historical writer. He was born February 1, 1892, in Atsuta, Hokkaido, and died July 19, 1968. Sometimes his name is spelled Kan Shimosawa (in New Tale of Zatoichi, Zatoichi the Fugitive). His real name was Umetani Matsutaro.

Works
He is the creator of several fictional works. Many of which have been adapted into movies. These include:
Shinsengumi Monogatari
1962's Zatoichi TV series and films
1962: The Tale of Zatoichi
1962: The Tale of Zatoichi Continues
1963: New Tale of Zatoichi
1963: Zatoichi: The Fugitive
1963: Zatoichi: On the Road
1970: Zatoichi Meets Yojimbo
1971: Zatoichi and the One-Armed Swordsman
2003: Zatōichi
2008: Ichi

Historical figures
He has written several historical figures into his works, including:
Takeda Kanryūsai
Yamazaki Susumu

References

Japanese historical novelists
1892 births
1968 deaths
20th-century novelists
Writers from Hokkaido